A Buddhist temple or Buddhist monastery is the place of worship for Buddhists, the followers of Buddhism. They include the structures called vihara, chaitya, stupa, wat and pagoda in different regions and languages. Temples in Buddhism represent the pure land or pure environment of a Buddha. Traditional Buddhist temples are designed to inspire inner and outer peace.

Architecture

Its architecture and structure varies from region to region. Usually, the temple consists not only of its buildings, but also the surrounding environment. The Buddhist temples are designed to symbolize five elements: fire, air, water, earth and wisdom.

India

The design of temples in India was influenced by the idea of a place of worship as a representation of the universe. For Buddhist temple complexes one tall temple is often centrally located and surrounded by smaller temples and walls. This center surrounded by oceans, lesser mountains and a huge wall.

A Chaitya, Chaitya hall or Chaitya-griha refers to a shrine, sanctuary, temple or prayer hall in Indian religions. The term is most common in Buddhism, where it refers to a space with a stupa and a rounded apse at the end opposite the entrance, and a high roof with a rounded profile. Strictly speaking, the chaitya is the stupa itself, and the Indian buildings are chaitya halls, but this distinction is often not observed. Many of the early Chaitya were rock-cut, as in Karla caves or Ajanta.

Some of the earliest free-standing temples may have been of a circular type. Ashoka also built the Mahabodhi Temple in Bodh Gaya circa 250 BCE, a circular structure, in order to protect the Bodhi tree under which the Buddha had found enlightenment. The Bairat Temple is also a round structure, which can be seen through archaeological remains. Representations of this early temple structure are found on a 100 BCE relief sculpted on the railing of the stupa at Bhārhut, as well as in Sanchi. From that period the Diamond throne remains, an almost intact slab of sandstone decorated with reliefs, which Ashoka had established at the foot of the Bodhi tree. These circular-type temples were also found in later rock-hewn caves such as Tulja Caves or Guntupalli.

Indonesia

Buddhism is the second oldest religion in Indonesia after Hinduism, which arrived from India around the second century. The history of Buddhism in Indonesia is closely related to the history of Hinduism, as a number of empires influenced by Indian culture were established around the same period. The oldest Buddhist archaeological site in Indonesia is arguably the Batujaya stupas complex in Karawang, West Java. The oldest relic in Batujaya was estimated to originate from the 2nd century, while the latest dated from the 12th century. Subsequently, significant numbers of Buddhist sites were found in Jambi, Palembang and Riau provinces in Sumatra, as well as in Central and East Java. The Indonesian archipelago has, over the centuries, witnessed the rise and fall of powerful Buddhist empires, such as the Sailendra dynasty, the Mataram and Srivijaya empires.

According to some Chinese source, a Chinese Buddhist monk I-tsing on his pilgrim journey to India, witnessed the powerful maritime empire of Srivijaya based on Sumatra in the 7th century. A number of Buddhist historical heritages can be found in Indonesia, including the 8th century Borobudur mandala monument and Sewu temple in Central Java, Batujaya in West Java, Muaro Jambi, Muara Takus and Bahal temple in Sumatra, and numerous of statues or inscriptions from the earlier history of Indonesian Hindu-Buddhist kingdoms.

During the era of Kediri, Singhasari and Majapahit empire, Buddhism—identified as Dharma ri Kasogatan—was acknowledged as one of kingdom's official religions along with Hinduism. Although some of kings might favour Hinduism over another, nevertheless the harmony, toleration and even syncretism were promoted as manifested in Bhinneka Tunggal Ika national motto, coined from Kakawin Sutasoma, written by Mpu Tantular to promotes tolerance between Hindus (Shivaites) and Buddhists. The classical era of ancient Java also had produces some of the exquisite examples of Buddhist arts, such as the statue of Prajnaparamita and the statue of Buddha Vairochana and Boddhisttva Padmapani and Vajrapani in Mendut temple.

In contemporary Indonesian Buddhist perspective, Candi refers to a shrine, either ancient or new. Several contemporary viharas in Indonesia for example, contain the actual-size replica or reconstruction of famous Buddhist temples, such as the replica of Pawon and Plaosan's perwara (small) temples. In Buddhism, the role of a candi as a shrine is sometimes interchangeable with a stupa, a domed structure to store Buddhist relics or the ashes of cremated Buddhist priests, patrons or benefactors.

Japan

Japanese Buddhist temples typically include a Main Hall.

A distinctive feature is the chinjusha, a Shinto shrine devoted to the temple's kami. Buddhism co-existed with Shinto, but in the 8th century Buddhism became the state religion and Buddhist temples were built. High concentration of important Japanese Buddhist temples can be found in Japanese culture heartland of Kansai region, especially in Nara and Kyoto.

Thailand

Buddhist temples in Thailand are known as wat, from the Pāḷi vāṭa, meaning "enclosure". Wat architecture adheres to consistent principles. A wat, with few exceptions, consists of two parts: the Phutthawat and the Sangkhawat. The Phutthawat is the area which is dedicated to Buddha. While the Sangkhawat is the area which is dedicated to Sangha Buddhist monastic community.

Sri Lanka

Buddhist temples in Sri Lanla are known as 'Pansala' or 'Viharaya' in Sinhalese. Common features in Sri Lankan temples include Stupa, Bo Tree and Temple Buildings. Oldest living human-planted Bodhi Tree in the world Jaya Sri Maha Bodhi and some of the largest Stupa in the world including Ruwanwelisaya, Jetavanaramaya and Abhayagiri vihāra located in Sri Lankan temples.

See also
Gautama Buddha
Dhamma
Sangha
Three Refuges
Five Precepts
Pāli Canon
Uposatha
Cetiya
Sri Maha Bodhi
Vihara
Wat
Kyaung
Burmese pagoda
List of Buddhist temples
Buddhist architecture
Aniconism in Buddhism

References

Temple
Temple